The Northwestern Conference was an IHSAA-sanctioned athletic conference involving schools from Gary, Indiana.

History
The conference was formed in 1963, after the West Division of the Northern Indiana Conference split. At this time, the conference encompassed most of the schools in Gary (except for Edison, Roosevelt, and Wirt; Edison would close in 1968, the other two would join later), Hammond (except for Gavit and Morton, who would join in 1966), and East Chicago schools, as well as the schools from Valparaiso and Whiting.

The conference expanded to 16 schools in 1966, adding Hobart High School, as well as Gary Roosevelt, Hammond Gavit and Hammond Morton. The expansion moved the conference into divisions: the East Division consisted of the Gary schools, Hobart, and Valparaiso, the West Division consisting of the East Chicago, Hammond, and Whiting schools.

The conference changed its name to the Gary City Series in 1968, as Hobart and Valparaiso became independent, with the rest of the non-Gary schools formed the Indiana Lake Shore Conference. These schools would be replaced by parochial school Andrean, and the new Gary West Side. The next year, Gary Froebel and Tolleston closed, and the conference reverted to the Northwestern Conference moniker. Wirt would join in 1970 from the old Calumet Conference, and Andrean left to be independent in 1975.

The conference membership has decreased over the years as schools closed (Emerson in 1981, Mann in 2004,Wirt in 2009, and Lew Wallace in 2014), with the remaining two schools forced to become independent in 2014.

Membership

Membership timeline

Resources
 IHSAA Conferences
 IHSAA Directory

Indiana high school athletic conferences
High school sports conferences and leagues in the United States